Luigi (Gino) De Crescenzo (born 5 March 1964), best known as Pacifico, is an Italian singer-songwriter, composer and musician.

Background 
Born in Milan, the son of a Neapolitan father and mother from Salerno, at 16 years old De Crescenzo formed his first band, "La Goccia". After graduating in political science and various experiences through rock, jazz, and fusion, in 1989 he formed together with Luca Gemma "Rossomaltese", a group in whom De Crescenzo was composer and guitarist. After the group disbanded he collaborated with the director Roberta Torre, composing the score of the film South Side Story and the incidental music for the play Invece che all’una alle due.

In 2000 De Crescenzo adopted the stage name Pacifico, making his solo record debut in 2001 with a critically acclaimed album with the same name. In 2004 he entered the main competition at the Sanremo Music Festival, with the song "Solo un sogno". During the following years he alternated his activity as singer-songwriter (opening concerts for Kings of Convenience, Luca Carboni and Cousteau, among others) with the activity of composer, notably collaborating with Adriano Celentano, Andrea Bocelli, Gianna Nannini, Marco Mengoni, Antonello Venditti, Malika Ayane, Zucchero Fornaciari and Ornella Vanoni.

Discography
2001 - Pacifico
2004 - Musica leggera
2006 - Dolci frutti tropicali
2009 - Dentro ogni casa
2012 - Una voce non basta
2013 - In cosa credi (EP)

References

External links
 

1964 births
Singers from Milan
Italian pop singers
Italian jazz singers
Italian male singers
Living people
Italian singer-songwriters
Italian male composers
Italian film score composers
Italian male film score composers
Male jazz musicians